Swimming at the 2013 Canada Summer Games was in Sherbrooke, Quebec at the Universite de Sherbrooke for diving and swimming.  It was held from the 4 to 17 August.  There were 70 events of swimming.

Medal table

The following is the medal table for swimming at the 2013 Canada Summer Games.

The following medal table provides a statistical analysis by subtracting, focusing, and combining paralympic and Special Olympic events from the total medals counted. This table sorts by total medals minus PSO.
Key 
PSO = Paralympic and Special Olympic

Results

Men's

Para and Special Olympics

Women's

Para and Special Olympics

References

External links 

2013 Canada Summer Games
2013 in swimming
2013 Canada Games